The Garte Valley Railway or Göttingen Narrow Gauge Railway (Göttinger Kleinbahn AG), was a narrow-gauge rail line that served to connect the area east of the city to Göttingen, Lower Saxony, Germany, from  1897 through 1959.

The company was founded on November 16, 1896.  Already in the next year, a 750 mm narrow-gauge line running along the Garte stream was laid in the direction of Rittmarshausen.

Originally going from Göttingen to Rittmarshausen, it was extended in 1907 to reach Duderstadt. The section to Duderstadt was not very popular and was temporarily discontinued in 1922. It was soon reinstated but permanently discontinued in 1931.  With the rise of private vehicles and an adequate bus service, the remaining service was discontinued in the 1950s: in 1957 regular passenger service on the line ceased, and in 1959 the line closed with the last of its freight service. The tracks were dismantled.

Today a part of the railway terrace is used in the Lower Saxony bicycle-path systems, being a section of the Weser-Harz-Heide Cycle Route (Lower Saxony long-distance route RFW 5).

Route 
0.0 Göttingen Staatsbahnhof until 1922 
0.4 Göttingen Gartetalbahnhof from 1922 
1.1 Göttinger Brauhaus 
2.0 Lindenkrug 
4.0 Landwehrschenke 
5.7 Garteschenke 
9.3 Diemarden 
10.7 Klein Lengden 
11.9 Steinsmühle 
12.8 Eichenkrug 
13.9 Benniehausen 
15.0 Waterloo 
16.1 Gartebrücke 
16.9 Wöllmarshausen 
18.1 Rittmarshausen 
18.7 Gartebrücke 
19.2 Kerstlingerode 
20.6 Beienrode 
22.6 Weißenborn 
26.5 Nathebrücke 
29.6 Nesselröden 
33.3 Westerode 
35.6 Duderstadt

Reference material 
 Karl Burmester: Göttinger Kleinbahn A.G. – Chronik der Gartetalbahn, 1897-1957: 60 Jahre Kleinbahngeschichte. Verlag Göttinger Tageblatt, Göttingen 1987, 
 DVD Gartetalbahn, ed. by Institut f. wissenschaftlichen Film (IWF) gGmbH, Z12900
 Gerd Wolff: Deutsche Klein-und Privatbahnen. Band 11: Niedersachsen 3 - Südlich des Mittellandkanals. EK-Verlag, Freiburg 2009, .

External links 
Duderstadt.de: article 
The Garte Valley Railway in and around Rittmarshausen 
Garte Valley station 
Video 
Lokomotive.de: history 
General information and history 
 

Railway lines in Lower Saxony
750 mm gauge railways in Germany